Robert Barrow may refer to:

 Robert Irving Barrow (1805-circa 1890), artist and architectural illustrator
 Robert H. Barrow (1922–2008) United States Marine Corps four-star general